General elections were held in Lesotho on 27 and 28 January 1970, the first since independence in 1966. They were won by the opposition Basutoland Congress Party, but without announcing the results, the ruling Basotho National Party carried out a coup d'état by declaring a state of emergency, annulling the election, dissolving parliament and suspending the constitution. King Moshoeshoe II was sent into exile after expressing disapproval of the actions.

Leabua Jonathan then dictated the country until 1986 when a military coup d'état led by Major General Justin Lekhanya deposed him. Lesotho was not returned to democratic rule until the 1993 elections, which were again won by the BCP in a landslide victory.

Results
Official results were never published, but figures were made available by election observers.

References

Lesotho
Elections in Lesotho
1970 in Lesotho
Annulled elections
Election and referendum articles with incomplete results